John Rowland Smith (18 June 1891 – 17 April 1958) was an  Australian rules footballer who played with St Kilda in the Victorian Football League (VFL).

Football
One of nine new players in the team, Smith played his only First XVIII match for St Kilda against Carlton, at Princes park, on 29 July 1911. They were required because many of the regular St Kilda First XVIII  players were on strike.

The other new players were: Alby Bowtell, Roy Cazaly, Claude Crowl, Peter Donnelly, Alf Hammond, Otto Opelt, Tom Soutar, and Bill Ward — and, including that match, and ignoring Harrie Hattam (16 games), Bert Pierce (41 games), and Bill Woodcock (65 games), the very inexperienced team's remaining fifteen players had only played a total of 46 matches.

Notes

References

External links 

1891 births
1958 deaths
Australian rules footballers from Melbourne
St Kilda Football Club players
Caulfield Football Club players
People from Carlton North, Victoria